Anatharu is a 2007 Indian Kannada action drama film directed by Sadhu Kokila and is the Kannada remake of the 2003 Tamil film Pithamagan. It stars Upendra, Darshan, Radhika, and Sanghavi. Upon theatrical release, the film met with favourable reviews, critics particularly highlighting with Upendra's portrayal of Rudra, an orphaned gravedigger.

Cast

Soundtrack
 "Ello Hutti Ello Haridu" – Hariharan
 "Janana Janana Idu" – Madhu Balakrishnan
 "Jagave Rakshasara" – S. P. Balasubrahmanyam
 "Yaaro Nee Nanna" – Mohammed Aslam
 "Old songs Remix" – Various

Reception 
A critic from The Times of India wrote that "Though the first half of the film fails to impress, the latter half is more comprehensible. But the overdose of blood-curdling violence sends out a wrong message". A critic from Rediff.com wrote that "If you have not seen Pithamagan, Anaatharu is definitely worth watching especially for Upendra and the efforts of Sadhu's technical team".

References

External links 
 

2000s Kannada-language films
2007 films
2007 drama films
Kannada remakes of Tamil films
Films directed by Sadhu Kokila